Marathyssa minus is a species of moth in the family Euteliidae. It is found in North America.

The MONA or Hodges number for Marathyssa minus is 8956.1.

References

Further reading

 
 
 

Euteliinae
Articles created by Qbugbot
Moths described in 1921